Archipelago Films is a New York based film and television production company. It was founded in 1991 by Academy Award-nominated and Emmy Award-winning filmmakers Andrew Young and Susan Todd. Together, they have produced, directed, and provided cinematography for over a dozen documentaries on social and environmental topics. In addition to their documentary work, Young and Todd have a filmography that include short narrative films, museum exhibit pieces, and films for nonprofit NGOs and corporations.

They are known to employ a variety of digital cinematography techniques such as utilizing miniature cameras, probe lenses, aerial mounts, underwater housings, and remote control cameras to visualize the perspectives of their subjects.

History 

The name of the company is associated with its first film, The Spirit of Kuna Yala, made in 1991. The film features the Kuna Indians of Panama's San Blas archipelago as they "unite to protect their rainforest homeland, Kuna Yala, and the tradition it inspires." The film is told entirely in the words of the Kunas.

The company's second film, Children of Fate: Life and Death in a Sicilian Family, was nominated for an Academy Award for best documentary. The film follows up on the same Sicilian family documented in the 1961 film Cortile Cascino, which was directed by Andrew Young's father, Robert Young. In the updated portrait, Angela Capra is still fighting for her family, against "a vicious cycle of poverty, ignorance and crime" in a Palermo slum. Children of Fate won the Grand Jury Prize and the Cinematography Award at the Sundance Film Festival.

In 1996, Young and Todd produced, directed, and photographed Cutting Loose, a feature-length documentary about the New Orleans Mardi Gras, for French and German television.

Archipelago Films has also collaborated with Edward James Olmos and his company Olmos Productions for several feature documentaries. One of these films, commissioned by the United States Justice Department, It Ain't Love, is a story of teenage dating violence, following members of a young improv company as they re-enact their abusive relationships. Subsequently, they directed the HBO documentary: Americanos: Latino Life in the United States which featured notable Hispanic icons, including Carlos Santana and Tito Puente. Their depiction of the lives of teenage gang members in Eastern Los Angeles, Lives in Hazard, was introduced by president Bill Clinton primetime on NBC.

In addition to contributing to various nature series and productions, Archipelago has produced a number of nature films. Archipelago's Madagascar: A World Apart was featured as part of the PBS series Living Edens. Archipelago Films has also had an ongoing collaboration with the Wildlife Conservation Society's Bronx Zoo, working on the media components of new exhibits, including the film at the Congo Gorilla Forest exhibit.

Archipelago Films has been filming wildlife in Eastern North America. Their footage of the breeding rituals of the North American wood duck was used in the PBS Nature show An Original DUCKumentary, which won the 2013 Emmy Award for Outstanding Nature Programming, and was nominated for Best Factual Series.

In 2018, Archipelago Films made their first 3D Giant Screen project, Backyard Wilderness, produced through Andrew Young and Susan Todd’s 501(c)3 organization Arise Media, SK Films, and Tangled Bank Studios. Young and Todd directed the film together with Young as Director of Photography. The film follows a young girl who “gradually discovers the intricate secrets that nature has hidden so close to her front door,” captured with cameras “mounted inside dens and nests, and moving along the forest floor and pond bottom.”  It earned accolades from the Giant Screen Cinema Association, the Beijing International Film Festival, The Jackson Hole Science Media Awards, and International Wildlife Film festival. The release of Backyard Wilderness was also accompanied by an impact campaign consisting of programming at more than 50 libraries and science centers, as well as an app titled “Seek.”  Seek “encourages kid-friendly citizen science” and is the work of the iNaturalist group.

Recently, Archipelago Films has continued their work in IMAX cinema, with SK Films distributing Wings Over Water in 2022. Young was director, producer, and director of photography, and Todd was a producer. The film tells the story of the “triumphs and challenges” of three bird families: the Sandhill Crane, the Yellow Warbler and the Mallard Duck. The conservation narrative is heavily focused on prairie wetlands, where 200 species of migratory birds rely on its ecosystem. Called “one of the most epic bird films ever produced” by Forbes, the production was also supported by the National Audubon Society, the Max McGraw Wildlife Foundation, Delta Waterfowl, and Ducks Unlimited.  It features narration from actor Micheal Keaton, as well as music from Huey Lewis, who have both expressed passions for conservation. Like Backyard Wilderness (2018), Wings Over Water (2022) also had educational materials released along with the film, and had exhibitions in museums and science centers across the United States, including the American Museum of Natural History and Denver Natural History Museum.

Filmography and awards

References

External links 
 
 YouTube page

1991 establishments in New York (state)
Film production companies of the United States
Companies based in New York City